The Chester Series is a geologic group in Kentucky. It preserves fossils dating back to the Carboniferous period.

See also

 List of fossiliferous stratigraphic units in Kentucky

References
 

Geologic groups of Kentucky